Reliquiae  is the seventh album by Swedish Dark ambient project Atrium Carceri. It was released on March 18, 2012 through Cold Meat Industry

Track listing

Personnel
 Simon Heath

References

http://www.discogs.com/Atrium-Carceri-Reliquiae/release/3483924

2012 albums